Girl on the loose is a 1954 Hong Kong film, directed by Wang Yin.

Cast
 Li Li-Hua as Yao Li-na
 Liu Chi as Mrs. Yao / stepmother
 Yang Chih-Ching as Yao Kuan-ting
 Chiang Kuang Chao as Classmate
 Hong Bo as Elder Kao
 Huang Fang as Teacher
 Lei Ta	
 Li Yun		
 Ma Li as Classmate
 Shen Yun as Classmate
 Wu Chia-hsiang as Kao Chia-bao

External links
 IMDb entry
 Hong Kong Cinemagic entry

1954 films
1950s Mandarin-language films
Hong Kong black-and-white films
Hong Kong drama films
1954 drama films